Seioglobal formerly "SSG" / Safesoft Global (Chinese: 晟峰成略, Hanyu Pinyin: Sheng Feng Cheng Lve), (registered as Shanghai Seio Software Technology Co., Ltd) also commonly known locally as “Seio”, is an IT service multinational corporations based in Shanghai with focus on providing information technology consulting and software development services to Forbes Global 2000 companies and multinational corporations. In its portfolio it also develops Offshore Development Centers (ODC) for multinational corporations via its almost “no” language barrier talent model and is one of the few companies in its industry in China that owns a 30,000sqm technology software park (Jiaxing Software Park refer to List of technology centers), in addition to its own training and development center.

History 

Established on January 27, 2003, at its headquarters, Shanghai, the company developed Information Technology Outsourcing (ITO) and Business Process Outsourcing (BPO) solutions via applying security practices, structured global sourcing methodologies based on the Capability Maturity Model Integration (CMMI).

The company initially traded as “Sheng-feng Co., Ltd.” with a registered capital of 4.5 million US dollars and rapidly grew to become one of China's leading IT service companies. As of Dec 2007, the company sat on a US$17.92 million revenue base (from US$1.75 million in 2003), had won several exceptional quality awards within China, for ITO leadership, had 8 offices globally (6 in strategic locations within China), and plans to open a U.S. office in 2009.

The company also reported an 89% CAGR cumulative growth since its founding in 2003, had matured in its Capability Maturity Model Integration (CMMI Level 3), and had been initiating steps to attain Capability Maturity Model Integration (CMMI Level 5) certification. It is best known in China for its unique organization logo story, its rapid organizational growth (which started from just 15 employees), and locally known as the ‘China’s youth IT dreams company’ is its built upon the entrepreneurship spirit.

On 28 July 2008, due to business development growth and to better serve international markets, once known as SSG (Safesoft Global), the company was re-branded to Seioglobal.

The new brand, Seioglobal was reported to represents developments in its  decentralized culture, commitment for quicker delivery of the organizations services and streamlined operations. Its headquarters and operations had also been relocated to a new high-riser building offering newer amenities in downtown Shanghai.

Critical Times
In its early stages, the company had to make complex strategic decisions that would lay down the foundation for its development.  In doing so, the organization  foresaw the need for rapid organizational growth in order to survive the on coming competitive times. During these times, the company was heavily driven by the entrepreneurship spirit.

However, it was not satisfied and reorganized the company via its Japanese roots to diversify it and focused on intensifying independent innovations within Shanghai’s surrounding 2nd tier cities such as Wuxi and Jiaxing.

Upgrading for competition
For developing and attracting software development, information services to China’s developing metropolitan cities, the company quickly adhered to the nation’s “Eleventh Five-Year Plan." Such actions were to shape the strategy for the company for its coming challenging years. and in 2003, the company invested in several strategic 2nd tier metropolitan cities in China and opened up offices in Tokyo and Osaka in Japan.

Philanthropy
The company strives to be social responsible and on May 21, 2008, initiated a donation campaign to the quake hit areas of the Sichuan basin that were affected by the May 12 earthquake, one of the provinces in which it has branch offices.

See also
Software industry in China
China Software Industry Association

References

External links
  Official Company Website
  Official Parent / Group Company Website

Outsourcing companies
Multinational companies
International information technology consulting firms
Software companies of China
Chinese brands
Science and technology in the People's Republic of China
Companies based in Shanghai
Companies established in 2003
Engineering companies of China